Linden Grove Pavilion is a historic pavilion located at Coopersburg, Lehigh County, Pennsylvania. It was built about 1900, and is a -story, rectangular building with textured wooden siding and a slate covered hipped roof in the Queen Anne style. It is 10 bays wide, 60 feet by 40 feet. It was used as an exercise and auction pavilion for animals and machinery, and later as a warehouse.

It was listed on the National Register of Historic Places in 1979.  It is a contributing property to the Coopersburg Historic District.

References 

Agricultural buildings and structures on the National Register of Historic Places in Pennsylvania
Queen Anne architecture in Pennsylvania
Buildings and structures completed in 1900
Buildings and structures in Lehigh County, Pennsylvania
Historic district contributing properties in Pennsylvania
National Register of Historic Places in Lehigh County, Pennsylvania